Below there are the squads from the participating teams of the 2011 FIVB Volleyball World League.

C indicates the Captain of the team.
L indicates the Libero of the team.

































External links

Argentina Team Page
Brazil Team Page
Bulgaria Team Page
Cuba Team Page
Finland Team Page
France Team Page
Germany Team Page
Italy Team Page

Japan Team Page
Poland Team Page
Portugal Team Page
Puerto Rico Team Page
Russia Team Page
Serbia Team Page
South Korea Team Page
United States Team Page

2011 in volleyball
2011 squads